Christopher Thomas Byrne (born 9 February 1975) is an English former professional footballer who played as a midfielder for various teams in the Football League.

References

External links

1975 births
Living people
People from Hulme
English footballers
Association football midfielders
Macclesfield Town F.C. players
Sunderland A.F.C. players
Stockport County F.C. players
English Football League players